The U23 Women's individual pursuit was one of the 8 women's under-23 events at the 2008 European Track Championships, held in Pruszków, Poland. It took place from 5 to 6 September 2008. 17 cyclists participated in the contest.

Competition format
The women's individual pursuit consists of a 3 km time trial race between two riders, starting on opposite sides of the track. If one rider catches the other, the race is over.

The tournament consisted of an initial qualifying round. The top four riders advanced to the semifinals.  The winners of the semifinals advanced to the gold medal match and losers advanced to the bronze medal race.

Schedule
Friday 5 September
12:08-12:58 Qualifying
Saturday 6 September
19:10-19:25 Finals
19:30:-19:35 Victory Ceremony

Source

Results

Qualifying

Source

Semifinals

Semifinal 1

Semifinal 2

Source

Final

Source

Final classification

Sources

References

2008 European Track Championships
Women's individual pursuit